The International Ocean Film Festival (IOFF), formerly the San Francisco Ocean Film Festival, is a film festival held in San Francisco, US, that features films about marine life, the ocean, coastal cultures and conservation. The 2013 event took place from March 7–10, 2013, at the Theater 39 on Pier 39 and featured a multimedia presentation by Jean-Michel Cousteau at the opening gala.

Celebrating its 10th edition in 2013, this is the first dedicated Ocean Film Festival in North America and the second in the world after the acclaimed Festival International du Film Maritime, exploration et l'environnement, in Toulon, France, founded in 1954. IOFF has become the premier venue for international marine filmmakers to screen their works to a growing North American audience and has inspired the creation of several other ocean film festivals in the US, including the Blue Ocean Film Festival.

All films selected for the festival are eligible to compete for awards in Adventure, Coastal Culture, Environment, Conservation, Short Film and Wildlife categories.

History
The International Ocean Film Festival was founded in 2004 and is a volunteer-driven 501(c)3 non-profit organization. IOFF has offered a different program each year. Past award winners have included:

Wildlife Film:
Sex under the Sea (Belgium), Etienne Verhaegen;
Giants of the Dee (Germany), Ralf Kiefner & Andrea Ramalho

Adventure Film:
Rescue Men: The Story of the Pea Island Surfmen (USA), Allan Smith;
Come Hell or High Water (USA), Keith Malloy

Animated Film:
I’m Going to Bite Someone (USA), Steve Dildarian

Coastal Culture Film:
Papa Mau (USA), Na’alehu Anthony;
The Giant and the Fisherman (Italy), Manfred Bortoli

Environmental Film:
Sanctuary in the Sea (USA), Robert Talbot;
Plastic Paradise – The Great Pacific Garbage Patch (USA), Angela Sun

Conservation Film:
In the Wake of Giants (USA), Lou Douros;
Saving the Ocean – The Sacred Islands (USA), John Angier

Short Film:
The Krill is Gone (USA), Jeffrey Bost & Matt Briggs;
Sinistre – (Indonesia), Jose Lachat

Education program
The International Ocean Film Festival creates student and family programs to educate about ocean conservation, inspire viewers to make their own films, and encourage advocacy for the protection of ocean ecosystems. The 2011 student program took place from March 9–11, screening a dozen films and hosting a range of guest speakers for middle and high school student audiences from public, private, and home schools. The three days of free programming included free tours of the Aquarium of the Bay, as well as curriculum support and study guides relating to IOFF films.

Reservations are required for the IOFF education program.

The family program, directed to a younger audience, was held over two days, from March 12–13, 2011, with discounted admission. The films shown at family festival include:

External links
 International Ocean Film Festival official site
 San Francisco International Ocean Film Festival Facebook page
 International Ocean Film Festival Twitter page
 International Ocean Film Festival blog
 Festival YouTube channel
 Blue Ocean Film Festival

Film festivals in the San Francisco Bay Area
Film festivals established in 2004
2004 establishments in California